FabricLive.20 is a DJ mix compilation album by Joe Ransom, a part of the FabricLive Mix Series.

Track listing
  Pablo - Turntable Technology - Red Hook Recordings
  Keith Lawrence And Seanie-T - Muzik-Ed Special - Muzik-Ed Productions
  Rodney P - The Nice Up - Low Life/Riddim Killa
  Ty - So U Want More? (Refix) Ft Roots Manuva - Big Dada Recordings
  Evil Ed Ft Yungun - Nico Suave - Janomi Records
  Ali B presents Plan B - No New Styles - Air Recordings
  Luv Lite Massive - Bun De Wikkid (Pressure Drop Bassbeat Version) - One Eye Records
  M.I.A. - Galang - XL Recordings
  The Nextmen Ft Dynamite MC - High Score (Stanton Warriors Remix) - Scenario Records
  Cane Motto - Ain't Nuttin To It (Part Two) - One Eye Records
  Dizzee Rascal - Stand Up Tall - XL Recordings
  5th Suite - Una Funker - Functional Breaks
  Rennie Pilgrem - Coming Up For Air Ft Sara Whittaker-Gilbey (Koma & Bones Remix) - TCR
  Tayo Meets Precision Cuts Downtown - Breakbeat Girl - F.U.N Recordings
  Shut Up And Dance - Reclaim The Streets (Move Ya! And Steve Lavers Remix) - Shut Up And Dance
  Zinc - Go DJ (Remix) - Bingo Beats
  Dynamite MC - Industry - Strong Records

References

External links
Fabric: FabricLive.20

2005 compilation albums